Juan Guzmán, O.F.M. (1572 – 1 March 1634) was a Catholic prelate who served as Archbishop of Zaragoza (1633–1634), 
Archbishop of Tarragona (1627–1633), 
and Bishop of Islas Canarias (1622–1627).

Biography
Juan Guzmán was born in 1572 and ordained a priest in the Order of Friars Minor.
On 11 July 1622, he was appointed during the papacy of Pope Gregory XV as Bishop of Islas Canarias.
On 6 November 1622, he was consecrated bishop. 
On 6 October 1627, he was appointed during the papacy of Pope Urban VIII as Archbishop of Tarragona.
On 6 June 1633, he was appointed during the papacy of Pope Urban VIII as Archbishop of Zaragoza.
He served as Archbishop of Zaragoza until his death on 1 March 1634.

Episcopal succession
While bishop, he was the principal consecrator of:
Agustin de Hinojosa y Montalvo, Bishop of Nicaragua (1630);
Marcos Ramírez de Prado y Ovando, Bishop of Chiapas (1633);
Juan Cebrián Pedro, Bishop of Albarracin (1633); and
Gonzalo Chacón Velasco y Fajardo, Bishop of Calahorra y La Calzada (1633).

References

External links and additional sources
 (for Chronology of Bishops)
 (for Chronology of Bishops)
 (for Chronology of Bishops)
 (for Chronology of Bishops)
 (for Chronology of Bishops)
 (for Chronology of Bishops)

17th-century Roman Catholic archbishops in Spain
Bishops appointed by Pope Gregory XV
Bishops appointed by Pope Urban VIII
1572 births
1634 deaths
Franciscan bishops